Rossenarra House is a country house situated in new Rossenarra Demesne (formerly Castlehale and Snugsborough), near the village of Kilmoganny in County Kilkenny, Ireland. It is thought in local lore to have been designed by the architect James Hoban, who was also responsible for designing the White House in Washington, D.C., United States. It was built in 1819/24, the most likely designer being George R. Paine (who had worked in 1823 for William Morris-Reades relation the Ist Baron Carew) or Miles Kearney of Piltown (whose widow Ellen sued Williams widow for moneys owed in 1850). Built in the Palladian style, it was commissioned by William Morris-Reade, the owner of a large estate some 7,000 acres near Kilmoganny. It passed to William Morris-Reade's second son Frederick Richard Morris-Reade, who was born 1833 at Rossenarra and died as a pauper in the Work House at Michelstown, County Cork in 1898.

In 1850 and again in 1852 the whole estate and house was offered for sale by the Incumbent Estates Courts due to bankruptcy following the "Great Hunger" with some 1,500 acres being bought by the Morris family. In 1901/03 it came into the possession of the McEnery family who had been tenants of the house and some 1,000-odd acres of the remaining Reade Estates. It was sold to them by the Morris Reade descendants of Frederick's elder brother who were resident in Canada and where they still live. Sir John Lavery, the Irish artist celebrated for his portraits and related to the McEnerys through marriage, resided at Rossenarra during the last few years of his life and died there on 10 January 1941. 

The house was also for a time the home of the American author Richard Condon, famous for such works as The Manchurian Candidate and Prizzi's Honor. Condon lived in Rossenarra from 1971 until he returned to the United States in 1980. During this time, famous guests to the house included Mick Jagger and Frank Sinatra. The title of Condon's memoir, And Then We Moved to Rossenarra; Or, The Art of Emigrating (1973), refers to his time there. The most recent residents of the house were American tycoon Walter Griffith and his Irish-born wife, Christine.

References

Further reading
"The Reades of Co Tipperary and Kilkenny" By H F Morris and T Reade-Duncan. (1990 in The Irish Genealogist).

Houses in the Republic of Ireland
Buildings and structures in County Kilkenny
James Hoban buildings